Qarquluq-e Sofla (also Romanized as Qārqūlūq-e Soflá; also known as Ghar Gholoon Sofla, Qārqālūq-e Pā’īn, Qārqālūq-e Soflá, and Qārqūlūq-e Pā’īn) is a village in Zangebar Rural District, in the Central District of Poldasht County, West Azerbaijan Province, Iran. At the 2006 census, its population was 431, in 111 families.

References 

Populated places in Poldasht County